Remplacement militaire (French for "military replacement") was the name for a policy of military conscription which originated in France and Belgium in the 19th century. Under the system, wealthy citizens chosen for military service by lot could pay a sum of money, originally enough to pay someone else to serve in their place, instead of being made to join the military themselves. It was abolished in Belgium in 1913 and replaced by a system of service militaire personnel ("personal military service"): a form of universal conscription.

History

Policy
The Belgian army relied on both voluntary enlistment and, from 1902, also on recruitment by lot in order to keep its numbers constant. Both the Liberals and Catholics advocated Remplacement as a way of privileging the aristocratic and bourgeois classes and were united in defending it against reformers.

Abolition
The Belgian response to the Franco-Prussian War of 1870-1 highlighted the inadequacies of the country's military to defend its borders. The system of remplacement was viewed as an anachronism, constituting an unfair privilege for the wealthy and reducing the quality of the army's recruits. King Leopold II was particularly keen that the system be abolished and used his political influence to try to persuade  politicians to support reform. Major-General Guillaume, Minister of War and a former aide de camp to the king, pushed for the government to adopt a policy of personal military service, and resigned from the cabinet on 10 December 1872 when it would not. With both major political factions united in favour of Remplacement, and only the Belgian Workers' Party in favour, reform was delayed.

The system was finally abolished in 1909, to be replaced by system whereby one son per family would be eligible for conscription into the army. In 1913, Albert I finally managed to have a bill passed through parliament instituting compulsory conscription for all adult males over the age of 20.

References

Conscription by country
1909 disestablishments in Belgium
Military history of Belgium
19th century in Belgium
Draft evasion